Big Shoals State Park in Hamilton County, Florida is a Florida State Park. The park is situated on the Suwannee River and features Limestone bluffs as well as the biggest whitewater rapids in all of Florida.

See also
List of Florida state parks
List of Florida state forests

References

External links
 Big Shoals State Park at Florida State Parks
 Big Shoals State Park at State Parks
 Big Shoals State Park at Wildernet

State parks of Florida
Parks in Hamilton County, Florida